French Creek Presbyterian Church is a historic Presbyterian church located in French Creek, Upshur County, West Virginia. It was built in 1866 by settlers from New England, and is a simple rectangular frame building with a white weatherboard exterior.  It measures 50 feet by 40 feet and has a gable roof topped by a belfry.

It was listed on the National Register of Historic Places in 1974.

References

Churches on the National Register of Historic Places in West Virginia
Churches completed in 1866
19th-century Presbyterian church buildings in the United States
Buildings and structures in Upshur County, West Virginia
Presbyterian churches in West Virginia
National Register of Historic Places in Upshur County, West Virginia
1866 establishments in West Virginia